This is a bibliography of works about 19th-century philosopher Friedrich Nietzsche.

Literature 
 Abbey, Ruth, Nietzsche's Middle Period, New York: Oxford University Press, 2000, 
 Appel, Fredrick, Nietzsche Contra Democracy, New York: Cornell University Press, 1999, 
 Arena, Leonardo Vittorio, Nietzsche e il nonsense, Milan: Franco Angeli, 1994, 
 Arena, Leonardo Vittorio, Nietzsche in China in the XXth Century, ebook, 2012
 Aschheim, Steven E., The Nietzsche Legacy in Germany 1800-1990, Berkeley: University of California Press, 1992
 Bataille, Georges, Nietzsche and Fascists, in the January 1937 issue of Acéphale (available on-line)
 Bataille, Georges, On Nietzsche. St. Paul: Paragon House, 1993, 978-1557786449
 Babich, Babette E., Nietzsche's Philosophy of Science. Albany: State University of New York Press, 1994, 
 Benson, Bruce E., Pious Nietzsche: Decadence and Dionysian Faith.  Indiana: Indiana University Press, 2007, 
 Blondel, Eric, Nietzsche: The Body and Culture, Stanford: Stanford University Press, 1991, 
 Botwinick, Aryeh, Skepticism, Belief, and the Modern: Maimonides to Nietzsche,  Ithaca: Cornell University Press, 1997, 
Cauchi, Francesca, "Zarathustra contra Zarathustra: The Tragic Buffoon," Aldershot: Ashgate, 1998, 
 Chamberlain, Lesley, Nietzsche in Turin: An Intimate Biography. New York: Picador, 1998, 
 Clark, Maudemarie, Nietzsche on Truth and Philosophy, New York: Cambridge University Press, 1990, 
 Conway, Daniel W., Nietzsche's Dangerous Game: Philosophy in the Twilight of the Idols, Cambridge: Cambridge University Press, 1997, 
 Danto, Arthur C., Nietzsche as Philosopher, New York: Columbia University Press, 1980, 
 Deleuze, Gilles, Nietzsche and Philosophy New York: Columbia University Press, 1983, 
 Derrida, Jacques, Spurs, Nietzsche's Styles, Chicago: The University of Chicago Press, 1979, 
 Derrida, Jacques, The Ear of the Other: Otobiography, Transference, Translation, Lincoln & London: University of Nebraska Press, 1985, 
 Eberlein, Hermann-Peter, Flamme bin ich sicherlich! Friedrich Nietzsche, Franz Overbeck und ihre Freunde, Köln: Schmidt von Schwind-Verlag, 1999, 
 Eberwein, Dieter, Nietzsche's Writing Ball - a spot on Nietzsche's typewriter period, Schauenburg/Germany, www.eberwein-typoskriptverlag.de, 2005
 Foucault, Michel, Aesthetics, Method, and Epistemology, New York: The New Press, 1998, 
 Gaultier, Jules de., From Kant to Nietzsche, New York: Philosophical Library, 1961, 
 Gillespie, M. A., Nihilism before Nietzsche, Chicago: The University of Chicago Press, 1996, 
 Gilman, Sander L, ed., Conversations with Nietzsche: A Life in the Words of his Contemporaries. trans. David J. Parent, New York: Oxford University Press, Inc., 1987, 
 Golan, Zev, God, Man and Nietzsche, New York: iUniverse, 2007, 
 Green, Michael Steven, Nietzsche and the Transcendental Tradition, Urbana, Illinois University Press, 2002, 
 Habermas, Jürgen, "The Entry into Postmodernity: Nietzsche as a Turning Point" in The Philosophical Discourse of Modernity, Cambridge: The MIT Press, 1991, 
 Hales, Steven D. and Welshon, Rex. Nietzsche's Perspectivism, Urbana: University of Illinois Press, 2000, 
 Hatab, Lawrence J., Nietzsche's Life Sentence: Coming to Terms with Eternal Recurrence. London: Routledge, 2005, 
 Hayman, Ronald, Nietzsche, a Critical Life. New York: Oxford University Press, 1980, 
 Heidegger, Martin, Nietzsche: Volume I, The Will to Power as Art, San Francisco: Harper & Row, 1979 (note that the publication of these courses made in the 1930s is not integral)
 Heidegger, Martin, Nietzsche: Volume II, The Eternal Return of the Same, San Francisco: Harper & Row, 1984
 Heidegger, Martin, Nietzsche: Volume III, The Will to Power As Knowledge and As Metaphysics, HarperCollins, 1991, 
 Heidegger, Martin, Nietzsche: Volume IV, Nihilism, San Francisco: Harper & Row, 1982
 Heller, Erich, The Importance of Nietzsche: Ten Essays, Chicago: University of Chicago Press, 1988, 
 Higgins, Kathleen Marie, Comic Relief: Nietzsche's Gay Science. Oxford: Oxford University Press, 1999, 
 Hill, R. Kevin, Nietzsche's Critique: The Kantian Foundations of His Thought, New York: Oxford University Press, 1995, 
 Hollingdale, R. J., Nietzsche, Routledge & Kegan Paul, 1973, 
 Hollingdale, R. J., Nietzsche: The Man and His Philosophy, Revised Edition, Cambridge University Press, 1999, 
 Hunt, Lester H, Nietzsche and the Origin of Virtue. London: Routledge, 1991, 
 Huskinson, Lucy Nietzsche and Jung: The Whole Self in the Union of Opposites Brunner-Routledge, 2004,  
 Hyde, J. Keith, Concepts of Power in Kierkegaard and Nietzsche Ashgate, 2010, 
 Irigaray, Luce. Marine Lover: Of Friedrich Nietzsche, New York, Columbia University Press, 1980, 
 Jaspers, Karl, Nietzsche: An Introduction to the Understanding of his Philosophical Activity, Tucson: The University of Arizona Press, 1965, 
 Jung, Carl G, Nietzsche's “Zarathustra”, ed. James L. Jarrett. Princeton: Princeton University Press, 1988, 
 Kaufmann, Walter, Nietzsche: Philosopher, Psychologist, Antichrist (Fourth Edition), Princeton: Princeton University Press, 1974, 
 
 Klossowski, Pierre, Nietzsche and the Vicious Circle, The University of Chicago Press, 1997, 
 Kofman, Sarah, Nietzsche and Metaphor, Stanford: Stanford University Press, 1993, 
 Krell, David Farrell Nietzsche: A Novel State University of New York Press, Albany, 1996, 
 Krell, David Farrell Infectious Nietzsche Indiana University Press, 1996, 
 Lampert, Laurence, Nietzsche's Teaching: An Interpretation of Thus Spoke Zarathustra, New Haven: Yale University Press, 1986, 
 Lampert, Laurence, Nietzsche and Modern Times: A Study of Bacon, Descartes, and Nietzsche, New Haven: Yale University Press, 1993, 
 Lampert, Laurence, Leo Strauss and Nietzsche, Chicago: University of Chicago Press, 1996, 
 Lampert, Laurence, Nietzsche's Task: An Interpretation of Beyond Good and Evil, New Haven: Yale University Press, 2001
 Lavrin, Janko, Nietzsche: An Approach, London: Methuen, 1948, 
 Lemm, Vanessa, " Nietzsche´s Animal Philosophy : Culture, Politics, and the Animality of the Human Being " New York : Fordham University Press, 2009, 
 Liebert, Georges, Nietzsche and Music, translated by David Pellauer and Graham Parkes. Chicago: University of Chicago Press, 2004, 
 Leiter, Brian, Nietzsche on Morality, London: Routledge, 2002, 
 Levine, Peter, Nietzsche and the Modern Crisis of the Humanities, Albany: State University of New York Press, 1995, 
 Lomax, J. Harvey, Paradox of Philosophical Education: Nietzsche's New Nobility and the Eternal Recurrence in Beyond Good and Evil, Lanham: Lexington Books, 2003, 
 Löwith, Karl, From Hegel to Nietzsche: the Revolution in Nineteenth Century Thought, New York: Columbia University Press, 1991, 
 Löwith, Karl, Nietzsche's Philosophy of the Eternal Recurrence of the Same, Berkeley: University of California Press. 1997, 
 MacIntyre, Alasdair, After Virtue: A Study in Moral Theory, Notre Dame: University of Notre Dame Press, 1981, 
 MacIntyre, Alasdair, Whose Justice? Which Rationality?, Notre Dame: University of Notre Dame Press, 1988, 
 MacIntyre, Alasdair, Three Rival Versions of Moral Enquiry: Encyclopaedia, Genealogy, and Tradition, Notre Dame: University of Notre Dame Press, 1990, 
 Magnus, Bernd, Nietzsche's Existential Imperative. Bloomington: Indiana University Press, 1978, 
 Magnus, Bernd; Stewart, Stanley; and Mileur, Jean-Pierre. Nietzsche's Case: Philosophy As/And Literature, New York: Routledge, 1993, 
 Mandel, Siegfried, Nietzsche & the Jews, New York: Prometheus Books, 1998, 
 Mencken, Henry L., The Philosophy of Friedrich Nietzsche, California: The Noontide Press, 1982  Download PDF here
 Miklowitz, Paul S. Hegel, Nietzsche, and the End of Philosophy, Albany: State University of New York Press, 1998, 
 Montinari, Mazzino. Reading Nietzsche, trans. Greg Whitlock, University of Illinois Press, 2003, 
 Montinari, Mazzino.  "The Will to Power" does not exist (Sigrid Oloff-Montinari original Italian edition Centro Montinari (Italian))
 Moore, Gregory, Nietzsche, Biology and Metaphor. Cambridge: Cambridge University Press, 2002, 
 Müller-Lauter, Wolfgang, Nietzsche: His Philosophy of Contradictions and the Contradictions of his Philosophy, Urbana: University of Illinois Press, 1999, 
 Nehamas, Alexander, Nietzsche: Life as Literature, Cambridge: Harvard University Press, 1985, 
 Oliver, Kelly, Womanizing Nietzsche: Philosophy's Relation to the “Feminine.” New York and London: Routledge, 1995, 
 Olsen, Lance, Nietzsche's Kisses, Tallahassee: Fiction Collective Two, 2006, 
 Parkes, Graham, Composing the Soul: Reaches of Nietzsche's Psychology. Chicago and London: University of Chicago Press, 1994, 
 Pletch, Carl, Young Nietzsche: Becoming a Genius. New York: Free Press, 1991, 
 Porter, James I., Nietzsche and the Philology of the Future, Stanford: Stanford University Press, 2000, 
 Porter, James I., The Invention of Dionysus: An Essay on The Birth of Tragedy, Stanford: Stanford University Press, 2000, 
 
 Reginster, Bernard, The Affirmation of Life: Nietzsche on Overcoming Nihilism, Cambridge: Harvard University Press, 2006, 
 Richardson, John, Nietzsche's System. Oxford: Oxford University Press, 1996, 
 Richardson, John, Nietzsche's New Darwinism. Oxford: Oxford University Press, 2004, 
 Rosen, Stanley, The Mask of Enlightenment: Nietzsche's Zarathustra, New York: Cambridge University Press, 1995
 Rosen, Stanley, The Question of Being: A Reversal of Heidegger, New Haven: Yale University Press, 1993, 
 Safranski, Ruediger, Nietzsche: A Philosophical Biography, translated by Shelley Frisch. New York: W.W. Norton, 2002, 
 Sallis, John, Crossings: Nietzsche and the Space of Tragedy, Chicago & London: University of Chicago Press, 1991, 
 Salomé, Lou, Nietzsche, ed. and trans. Siegfried Mandel. Redding Ridge, Connecticut: Black Swan Books, Ltd., 1988, 
 Santayana, George, Egotism in German Philosophy, New York: Haskell House Publishers Ltd., 1971
 Santaniello, Weaver, Zarathustra's Last Supper: Nietzsche's Eight Higher Men, Ashgate Publishing, Ltd., 2005, 
 Santaniello, Weaver, "Nietzsche, God, and the Jews", Albany: SUNY Press, 2004, 
 Schaberg, William H., The Nietzsche Canon: A Publication History and Bibliography. Chicago: The University of Chicago Press, 1996, 
 Schacht, Richard, Nietzsche, Routledge & Kegan Paul, 1985, 
 Schacht, Richard, Making Sense of Nietzsche: Reflections Timely and Untimely, Urbana: University of Illinois Press, 1995, 
 Schain, Richard, The Legend of Nietzsche's Syphilis. Westport, CT: Greenwood Press, 2001, 
 Schrift, Alan D., Nietzsche and the Question of Interpretation: Between Hermeneutics and Deconstruction, New York: Routledge, 1990, 
 Schrift, Alan D., Nietzsche's French Legacy: A Genealogy of Poststructuralism, New York: Routledge, 1995, 
 Shapiro, Gary, Nietzschean Narratives. Bloomington: Indiana University Press, 1989, 
 Simmel, Georg, Schopenhauer and Nietzsche, Urbana: University of Illinois Press, 1991, 
 Sloterdijk, Peter, Thinker on Stage: Nietzsche's Materialism, Minneapolis: University of Minnesota Press, 1989, 
 Small, Robin, Nietzsche in Context, Aldershot: Ashgate Publishing Company, 2001, 
 Small, Robin, Nietzsche and Rée: A Star Friendship. Oxford: Oxford University Press, 2005, 
 Solomon, Robert C., Living With Nietzsche: What the Great “Immoralist” Has to Teach Us. Oxford: Oxford University Press, 2003, 
 Sorgner, Stefan Lorenz: Metaphysics without Truth - On the Importance of Consistency within Nietzsche’s Philosophy. In der Buchreihe Münchner Philosophische Beiträge, herausgegeben von N. Knoepffler, W. Vossenkuhl, S. Peetz und B. Lauth, Utz Verlag, München 1999.
 Stack, George J., Nietzsche's Anthropic Circle: Man, Science, and Myth, Rochester: University of Rochester Press, 2005, 
 Stambaugh, Joan, Nietzsche's Thought of Eternal Return, Baltimore, Johns Hopkins University Press, 1972, 
 Stambaugh, Joan, The Problem of Time in Nietzsche, Lewisburg: Bucknell University Press, 1987, 
 Stambaugh, Joan, The Other Nietzsche, New York: State University of New York Press, 1994, 
 Steinbuch, Thomas, A Commentary on Nietzsche's Ecce Homo. Lanham, MD: University Press of America, 1994, 
 Steiner, Rudolf, Friedrich Nietzsche: Fighter for Freedom, New York: Spiritual Science Library, 1985, 
 Stern, J. P. A Study of Nietzsche, Cambridge: Cambridge University Press, 1981, 
 Nietzsche and Asian Thought
 Strathern, Paul, "The Essential Nietzsche", Virgin Books Ltd., 2002, 
 Strong, Tracy B., Friedrich Nietzsche and the Politics of Transfiguration (Expanded Edition), Berkeley: University of California Press, 1988, 
 Tanner, Michael, "Nietzsche", Oxford University Press, 1994, 
 Tejera, V., Nietzsche and Greek Thought, Dordrecht: Martinus Nijhoff Publishers, 1987, 
 Vattimo, Gianni, Dialogue with Nietzsche, New York: Columbia University Press, 2006, 
 Waite, Geoff, Nietzsche's Corps/E: Aesthetics, Politics, Prophecy, or, The Spectacular Technoculture of Everyday Life, Durham: Duke University Press, 1998,  
 White, Alan, Within Nietzsche's Labyrinth. New York and London: Routledge, 1990, 
 Wilcox, John T., Truth and Value in Nietzsche, Ann Arbor: University of Michigan Press, 1974, 
 Young, Julian, Nietzsche's Philosophy of Art, Cambridge: Cambridge University Press, 1992, 
 Young, Julian, Nietzsche's Philosophy of Religion. Cambridge: Cambridge University Press, 2006, 
 Zuckert, Catherine H., Postmodern Platos: Nietzsche, Heidegger, Gadamer, Strauss, Derrida, Chicago: The University of Chicago Press, 1996, 
 Zupančič, Alenka, The Shortest Shadow. Nietzsche's Philosophy of the Two, Cambridge, Mass.: MIT Press, 2003,

Collections 

 'I Am Not A Man, I Am Dynamite!': Friedrich Nietzsche and the Anarchist Tradition, ed. John Moore, New York: Autonomedia, 2004, 
 Looking after Nietzsche, ed. Laurence A. Rickels, Albany, State University of New York Press, 1990
 Nietzsche and Antiquity: His Reaction and Response to the Classical Tradition, ed. Paul Bishop, Camden House, 2004, 
 Modern Critical Views: Friedrich Nietzsche, ed. Bloom, Harold, New York, New Haven, Philadelphia: Chelsea House Publishers, 1987
 Nietzsche, eds. Richardson, John, and Leiter, Brian, Oxford: Oxford University Press, 2001
 Nietzsche: A Collection of Critical Essays, ed. Robert C. Solomon, Garden City: Anchor Books, 1973
 Nietzsche: A Critical Reader, ed. Peter R. Sedgwick, Oxford: Blackwell Publishers Limited, 1995
 Nietzsche and the Rhetoric of Nihilism eds. Tom Darby, Bela Egyed, and Ben Jones, Ottawa: Carleton University Press, 1989
 Nietzsche as Postmodern: Essays Pro and Contra, ed. Clayton Koelb, Albany, State University of New York Press, 1990
 Nietzsche, Genealogy, Morality: Essays on Nietzsche's Genealogy of Morals, ed. Richard Schacht, Berkeley, University of California Press, 1994
 Nietzsche, Godfather of Fascism? On the Uses and Abuses of Philosophy, eds. Jacob Golomb and Robert S. Wistrich, Princeton: Princeton University Press, 2002
 Nietzsche: Imagery & Thought ed. Malcolm Pasley, London: Methuen, 1978
 Nietzsche's New Seas: Explorations in Philosophy, Aesthetics and Politics, eds. Michael Allen Gillespie and Tracy B. Strong, Chicago: University of Chicago Press, 1991
 Nietzsche's “On the Genealogy of Morals”: Critical Essays, ed. Acampora, Christa Davis, Lanham, MD: Rowman & Littlefield, 2006
 Reading Nietzsche, eds. Robert C. Solomon and Kathleen M. Higgins, New York: Oxford University Press, 1990
 Studies in Nietzsche and the Judaeo-Christian Tradition, eds. James C. O'Flaherty, Timothy F. Sellner, and Robert M. Helm, Chapel Hill: University of North Carolina Press, 1985
 Studies in Nietzsche and the Classical Tradition, eds. James C. O'Flaherty, Timothy F. Sellner, and Robert M. Helm, Chapel Hill: University of North Carolina Press, 1979
 The Cambridge Companion to Nietzsche, eds. Magnus, Bernd, and Kathleen M. Higgins, Cambridge: Cambridge University Press, 1996
 The New Nietzsche, ed. David B. Allison, New York: Delta, 1977
 Why We are not Nietzscheans, eds. Luc Ferry and Alain Renault, Chicago: University of Chicago Press, 1991
 Why Nietzsche Still? Reflections on Drama, Culture, and Politics, ed. Alan D. Schrift, Berkeley: University of California Press, 2000
 Willing and Nothingness: Schopenhauer as Nietzsche's Educator, ed. Janaway, Christopher, Oxford: Oxford University Press, 1998

Film and television 
 Beyond Good and Evil (1977)
 When Nietzsche Wept 
novel
 film (2007)
 Nietzsche's Kisses

 
Bibliographies of people